Corinne Ragazzacci (born 27 January 1969) is a French gymnast. She competed in five events at the 1984 Summer Olympics.

References

External links
 

1969 births
Living people
French female artistic gymnasts
Olympic gymnasts of France
Gymnasts at the 1984 Summer Olympics
Place of birth missing (living people)
20th-century French women